The Bell Island Blues are a senior ice hockey team based in Bell Island, Newfoundland and Labrador, Canada, they are currently in their 4th season as part of the Avalon East Senior Hockey League.

History 

The Blues were known as the Bell Island Wave prior to the 2010–11 season.

2011-2012 Roster

See also
List of ice hockey teams in Newfoundland and Labrador

External links 

Ice hockey teams in Newfoundland and Labrador
2008 establishments in Newfoundland and Labrador
Ice hockey clubs established in 2008
Senior ice hockey teams